Alpha is the sixth studio album by American rock band Sevendust. The album was released on March 6, 2007. It is the band's second album featuring Sonny Mayo on rhythm guitar and the first with him as part of the writing process. Alpha is also the first album by the band to be released under the Warner-affiliated Asylum Records, making Sevendust the first metal/rock band on that label (the rest being hip-hop and rap artists). The tracks "Driven" and "Feed" were featured on the video game, WWE Smackdown vs Raw 2008.

The album entered the U.S. Billboard 200 at number 14, selling about 42,000 copies in its first week.

The song "Burn" is the band's longest song to date.

Track listing

Personnel 
Sevendust
 Lajon Witherspoon – lead vocals
 John Connolly – lead guitar, backing vocals
 Vinnie Hornsby – bass
 Morgan Rose – drums, backing vocals
 Sonny Mayo – rhythm guitar

Production
John Connolly – producer, mixing
Shawn Grove – producer, mixing
Ted Jensen – mastering
Joe Miller – executive producer
Morgan Rose – producer, mixing

Charts

Album

Singles

References 

Sevendust albums
2007 albums
Asylum Records albums